Hoosick Falls is a village in Rensselaer County, New York, United States. The population was 3,501 at the 2010 census. During its peak,  in 1900, the village had a population of approximately 7,000. 

The village of Hoosick Falls is near the center of the town of Hoosick on NY 22. The village center is listed on the National Register of Historic Places as Hoosick Falls Historic District. The village has a thriving early-20th century downtown commercial district, and many of the buildings have been restored. Recent commercial additions include a bakery/sandwich shop, a French restaurant, a coffee roastery, an art gallery and bistro, and a barbecue joint with a live music venue.

Painter Grandma Moses is buried in the village. The site of the British entrenchments at the Battle of Bennington, 6 August 1777, is nearby and is maintained as Bennington Battlefield State Historic Site.

History 

Although this has been an issue of considerable debate, it's believed the first documented settlers came to Hoosick Falls, on the Hoosic River, around 1746. The French drove the settlers out in 1754 and most of the settlement was burned, but they returned and rebuilt after the French & Indian War ended. Hoosick Falls was incorporated as a village in 1827.

Walter A. Wood Mowing and Reaping Machine Co.

In 1852, a blacksmith named Walter A. Wood began manufacturing a reaper in Hoosick Falls. By the 1890s, the Walter A. Wood Mowing & Reaping Company was the largest farm machinery manufacturer in the world, taking up 85 acres (340,000 m2) on the west bank of the river. The Wood Company closed in 1924, mainly due to the introduction of John Deere's revolutionary self propelled farm equipment. Most of these facilities were used by the Colasta Corporation from the mid 1920s until the late 1950s. This company manufactured radio parts. Later, parts of this site were used as a lumber yard/hardware store. A rash of arson fires in the mid and late 1970s consumed the entire complex. The only buildings still in use today are outside of the main complex, the Interface Solutions Plant (formerly the Wood-Flong Paper Mill), which was Walter A Wood's steel foundry. The original Office Building is still present also. 

Along with the Walter Wood plant, Hoosick Falls was a boomtown in the 19th century. Many other businesses came to town, creating growth and prosperity. Hoosick Falls once had factories that made paper, small numbers of appliances, glass, and some nominal soda and beer bottling plants. A large number of rich Victorian homes were built during this period and are still there today, most in good shape. Hoosick Falls also served as a regional center of trade and export. Local farmers and manufacturers would come to town to sell their goods and load them on rail cars bound for New York City or abroad. These goods consisted of manufacturers, grain, milk, livestock, construction materials (mostly slate and brick), paper & pulp, timber and beverages.

Historic Sites 

The Estabrook Octagon House, Hoosick Falls Armory, Hoosick Falls Historic District, St. Mark's Episcopal Church, and United States Post Office are listed on the National Register of Historic Places.

The arts 
Hoosick Falls and the region has long been a landing place for artists of various interests.  Grandma Moses, the American folk artists who rose to fame after her work was discovered in Thorpe's Pharmacy in downtown Hoosick Falls by a passing New York City art dealer, was born close by and is buried in the Maple Grove Cemetery.  Jose De Creeft, the Spanish-born artist and sculptor best known for his sculpture of Alice in Wonderland in New York's Central Park kept a home in the village and is buried there. Jenny Holzer, the American conceptual artist, has lived just outside of the Village for years.  Yucel Erdogan, the NYC artist and photographer, operates the 3rd Eye Gallery in a renovated department store in the downtown commercial district.

Murals 
Hoosick Falls is noted for its murals and outdoors art displays.  The downtown hosts two significant murals, one by local artist Roger Weeden, that depicts the Grandma Moses painting, "Wagon Repair Shop".  The second is by regional artist Katie May Erskine, depicting an owl, reflecting the indigenous people's name for the location of the village: The Valley of the Owl.

Industry and manufacturing

Plastics Industry 
A local company, Dodge Fibers Corporation, started producing Teflon-based products in 1955. This business was quite successful and later sold to larger companies. However, the industry generated chemical pollution, especially PFOA. Concern developed locally in 2014, and in December, 2015, the Village advised residents to use bottled water provided for free by Saint-Gobain, the current owner of the plastics facilities. In 2017, the Village constructed a reverse-osmosis carbon filtration water treatment system, and has since provided PFOA-free water to all residents, The NYSDEC unveiled a proposal on December 3, 2021 to construct two new water wells for the town at an estimated cost of $9.7 million. These wells will be located to the south of the town and connected to the existing water treatment plant.

PFOA Crisis 
Following an investigation in 2014 by local residents concerned about apparent high rates of cancer in the area, PFOA was found in the local drinking water system. In December 2015, the Village advised residents to use bottled water provided for free by Saint-Gobain, the current owner of the plastics facilities and the party responsible for the pollution mitigation. In 2017, the Village, funded by Saint-Gobain constructed a reverse-osmosis carbon filtration water treatment system, and has since provided PFOA-free water to all residents, The NYSDEC unveiled a proposal on December 3, 2021 to construct two new water wells for the town at an estimated cost of $9.7 million. These wells will be located to the south of the town and connected to the existing water treatment plant. These capital improvements, as well as ongoing medical monitoring of potentially affected residents, are funded by a settlement with Saint-Gobain,

Geography 

The village is divided by the Hoosic River.

Hoosick Falls is bisected by NY Route 22. Public transportation to and from the village is provided between Albany and Bennington, Vermont by Yankee Trails World Travel's weekday-running Albany-Bennington Shuttle bus.

Demographics 

As of the census of 2000, there were 3,436 people, 1,382 households, and 880 families residing in the village. The population density was 1,998.8 persons per square mile (771.3/km2). There were 1,553 housing units at an average density of 903.4 per square mile (348.6/km2). The racial makeup of the village was 97.58% White, 0.55% African American, 0.41% Native American, 0.49% Asian, 0.06% Pacific Islander, 0.32% from other races, and 0.58% from two or more races. Hispanic or Latino of any race were 0.99% of the population.

There were 1,382 households, out of which 32.1% had children under the age of 18 living with them, 47.5% were married couples living together, 12.4% had a female householder with no husband present, and 36.3% were non-families. 30.9% of all households were made up of individuals, and 15.4% had someone living alone who was 65 years of age or older. The average household size was 2.43 and the average family size was 3.05. In the village, the population was spread out, with 25.9% under the age of 18, 8.4% from 18 to 24, 28.2% from 25 to 44, 19.5% from 45 to 64, and 18.0% who were 65 years of age or older. The median age was 38 years. For every 100 females, there were 89.7 males. For every 100 females age 18 and over, there were 85.8 males.

The median income for a household in the village was $36,731, and the median income for a family was $45,829. Males had a median income of $33,750 versus $23,313 for females. The per capita income for the village was $18,062. About 5.1% of families and 6.6% of the population were below the poverty line, including 8.6% of those under age 18 and 4.6% of those age 65 or over.

Notable people 
 Bob Eberly and Ray Eberle, brothers and Big Band singers.
 Private Harris S. Hawthorn, received the Medal of Honor for capturing Gen. Custis Lee (the son of Gen. Robert E. Lee) on April 6, 1865 at the Battle of Sailor's Creek, Virginia; he is buried in the Maple Grove Cemetery.
 Harriet Hoctor, ballerina, dancer, Broadway theatre and Hollywood actress was born in the village.
 Jenny Holzer, the conceptual artist, lives and works here.
 Alexander Ney, the Soviet emigre artist currently lives and works here.
 Jill Reeve, Former member of the United States women's national field hockey team
 Grandma Moses, renowned folk artist, lived here in the latter part of her life. Her work was first discovered by an art collector who noticed one of her paintings, many of which depicted Hoosick Falls and its surroundings, hanging in a local drug store.
 Harry Van Surdam, who "devised one of the first legal forward pass plays ever used by a college team," according to the Oklahoma Daily, in a 1966 article. In 1972, he was placed in the National Football Hall of Fame; the award hangs in the foyer of the Hoosick Falls Central School.
 Lewis A. Swyer, owner of a construction company that built many historic Albany landmarks, was born and spent early childhood in Hoosick Falls. His company, L.A. Swyer Co. Inc., built Albany landmarks including the Hilton Hotel, Ten Eyck Plaza, Twin Towers, State Street Centre, Bleecker Terrace Apartments, Albany Law School library and Temple Beth Emeth.
 Jose de Creeft, Spanish sculptor who created the famous statue of Alice in Wonderland in New York City's Central Park, had a house just outside Hoosick Falls. His ashes are buried beneath one of his sculptures in a park along Main street.
 George Verschoor, Verschoor developed, produced and directed the first four seasons of MTV's groundbreaking series The Real World, which launched the modern non-fiction genre and is one of the longest-running reality programs in history.

References

Further reading

External links 

 Hoosick Township Historical Society
 The Cheney Library

 
Villages in New York (state)
Villages in Rensselaer County, New York